Jakob Cedergren (born 10 January 1973) is a Swedish-born Danish actor. He has appeared in more than 40 films and television shows since 1998. He starred in the film Dark Horse, which was screened in the Un Certain Regard section at the 2005 Cannes Film Festival.

In 2009, he portrayed the Danish Prince Carl/King Haakon VII of Norway in the Norwegian TV-miniseries Harry & Charles. Maria Bonnevie played his wife, Maud. Since 2010 he has been starring in the Swedish crime series The Sandhamn Murders.

Selected filmography

 Stealing Rembrandt (2003)
 Dark Horse (2005)
 Offscreen (2006)
 The Killing (2007)
 Arn – The Knight Templar (2007)
 Arn – The Kingdom at Road's End (2008)
 Remix (2008)
 Terribly Happy (2008)
 Rage (2009)
 Submarino (2010)
 Morden i Sandhamn (2010-2018)
 Sorrow and Joy (2013)
 The Squad (2015)
 Compulsion aka Sadie (2016) as Alex
 The Guilty (2018)

References

External links

1973 births
Living people
Danish male film actors
Best Actor Bodil Award winners
21st-century Danish male actors
Danish people of Swedish descent